Ghost Wars: The Secret History of the CIA, Afghanistan, and Bin Laden, from the Soviet Invasion to September 10, 2001, abbreviated as Ghost Wars,  is a book written by Steve Coll, published in 2004 by Penguin Press. It won the 2005 Pulitzer Prize for General Non-Fiction.

Summary
The book provides an in-depth account of Central Intelligence Agency activity in Afghanistan from the time of the Soviet invasion to the aftermath of attacks on the World Trade Center and the Pentagon. Coll particularly notes the interplay between the CIA and its counterpart in Pakistan, Inter-Services Intelligence, which used CIA and Saudi Arabian funding to build militant Mujahideen training camps along the Pakistan–Afghanistan border in an effort to create radicalized, militant fighters sourced from many Arab countries to attack the Soviet occupation. Invariably, as Coll shows, this decision had long-lasting effects on the region.

Expanded edition and follow-up
Penguin published a slightly expanded edition in 2005 that added the work of the 9/11 Commission.

In 2011, Coll announced a follow-up to Ghost Wars. When asked about a release date for the book, Coll said "It will take a while. ... I'd like the second volume to hold up over time."

Awards
Steve Coll won the 2004 Lionel Gelber Prize for Ghost Wars. The work also received the 2005 Pulitzer Prize for General Non-Fiction.

See also
Charlie Wilson's War: The Extraordinary Story of the Largest Covert Operation in History

References

External links

Steve Coll discusses Ghost Wars at the Pritzker Military Museum & Library

2004 non-fiction books
American history books
History books about Afghanistan
Books about intelligence analysis
War on Terror books
Non-fiction books about the Central Intelligence Agency
21st-century history books
Pulitzer Prize for General Non-Fiction-winning works